Sophie Casey (born 22 October 1991) is an Australian rules footballer playing for the Collingwood Football Club in the AFL Women's (AFLW).

Early life and state football
Born in Holbrook, New South Wales, Casey was introduced to footy with Auskick. She played for three years with Riverina Lions in the Canberra League, while attending university in Wagga Wagga. She then joined VFLW club, Eastern Devils.

AFL Women's career
She made her debut in round 1, 2017, in the inaugural AFLW match at IKON Park against . In her second match of the season, Casey was cited for a high hit with the shoulder on  player Meg Downie, which caused Downie to lose consciousness. The match review panel set the ban at three matches, but allowed it to become two with an early guilty plea. The day following the incident, Casey contacted Downie to apologise. She scored her first goal on 12 March 2017, against .

Collingwood re-signed Casey for the 2018 season during the trade period in May 2017.

In May 2018, Casey was re-signed by Collingwood for the 2019 season.

Statistics
Statistics are correct to the end of the S7 (2022) season.

|- 
! scope="row" style="text-align:center" | 2017
|style="text-align:center;"|
| 22 || 5 || 1 || 0 || 7 || 14 || 21 || 7 || 13 || 0.2 || 0.0 || 1.4 || 2.8 || 4.2 || 1.4 || 2.6
|- 
! scope="row" style="text-align:center" | 2018
|style="text-align:center;"|
| 22 || 3 || 0 || 0 || 9 || 5 || 14 || 0 || 8 || 0.0 || 0.0 || 3.0 || 1.7 || 4.7 || 0.0 || 2.7
|- 
! scope="row" style="text-align:center" | 2019
|style="text-align:center;"|
| 22 || 7 || 0 || 0 || 20 || 8 || 28 || 2 || 15 || 0.0 || 0.0 || 2.9 || 1.1 || 4.0 || 0.3 || 2.1
|- 
! scope="row" style="text-align:center" | 2020
|style="text-align:center;"|
| 22 || 7 || 1 || 0 || 22 || 21 || 43 || 7 || 12 || 0.1 || 0.0 || 3.1 || 3.0 || 6.1 || 1.0 || 1.7
|- 
! scope="row" style="text-align:center" | 2021
|style="text-align:center;"|
| 22 || 10 || 0 || 0 || 23 || 31 || 54 || 9 || 17 || 0.0 || 0.0 || 2.3 || 3.1 || 5.4 || 0.9 || 1.7
|- 
! scope="row" style="text-align:center" | 2022
|style="text-align:center;"|
| 22 || 10 || 0 || 0 || 40 || 28 || 68 || 11 || 17 || 0.0 || 0.0 || 4.0 || 2.8 || 6.8 || 1.1 || 1.7
|- 
! scope="row" style="text-align:center" | S7 (2022)
|style="text-align:center;"|
| 22 || 11 || 0 || 0 || 50 || 32 || 82 || 13 || 19 || 0.0 || 0.0 || 4.5 || 2.9 || 7.5 || 1.2 || 1.7
|- class="sortbottom"
! colspan=3| Career
! 53
! 2
! 0
! 171
! 139
! 310
! 49
! 101
! 0.04
! 0.0
! 3.2
! 2.6
! 5.8
! 0.9
! 1.9
|}

References

External links

 

Living people
1991 births
Collingwood Football Club (AFLW) players
Australian rules footballers from New South Wales
Sportswomen from New South Wales